Sylver Hoffer (27 July 1967 – 1 July 2011) was a French professional footballer who played as a forward. In his career, he played for INF Vichy, Nîmes, Louhans-Cuiseaux, Martigues, Istres, Bourges, and Montluçon.

Personal life and death 
Sylver's partner is named Stéphanie, and his brother is named Romuald. He died on 1 July 2011, at the age of 43. His funeral was held on 6 July at the basilica of Saint-Germain-des-Fossés, and he was subsequently cremated at the crematorium of Vichy.

References 

1967 births
Living people
People from Uzès
Sportspeople from Gard
French footballers
Association football forwards
INF Vichy players
Nîmes Olympique players
Louhans-Cuiseaux FC players
FC Martigues players
FC Istres players
Bourges 18 players
Montluçon Football players
French Division 3 (1971–1993) players
Ligue 2 players
Ligue 1 players
Championnat National players
Championnat National 2 players
Footballers from Occitania (administrative region)